Anton Flešár (born 8 May 1944) is a retired Slovak football goalkeeper. Sometimes he even played as a striker at the Czechoslovak Cup campaign. His breakthrough came in Lokomotíva Košice where he spent most of his career. He overall made 260 appearances at the Czechoslovak First League.

Flešár earned two caps for the Czechoslovakia national football team and debuted against Luxembourg on 9 May 1970. He was a third choice of Czechoslovak manager Jozef Marko at the 1970 FIFA World Cup.

Honours
Czechoslovak First League
1965–66
Czechoslovak Cup
1977

External links
Anton Flešár at The Football Association of the Czech Republic

1944 births
Living people
Association football goalkeepers
Slovak footballers
Czechoslovak footballers
Czechoslovakia international footballers
Dukla Prague footballers
1970 FIFA World Cup players
People from Stropkov
Sportspeople from the Prešov Region